Abdangesar or Ab Dang Sar or Abdangsar may refer to:
 Abdangsar, Gilan
 Abdangesar, Amol, Mazandaran Province
 Ab Dang Sar, Savadkuh, Mazandaran Province